The 2018 Algerian Cup Final was the 54th final of the Algerian Cup. The final took place on May 1, 2018, at Stade 5 Juillet 1962 in Algiers with kick-off at 16:00.

Route to the final

Pre-match

Details

Media coverage

External links
soccerway.com

References

Cup
Algerian Cup Finals